Albert Weber (21 November 1888, in Berlin – 17 September 1940) was a German amateur football (soccer) player who competed in the 1912 Summer Olympics. He was a member of the German Olympic squad and played one match in the main tournament as goalkeeper.

References

External links 
 

1888 births
1940 deaths
German footballers
Germany international footballers
Association football goalkeepers
Olympic footballers of Germany
Footballers at the 1912 Summer Olympics
Footballers from Berlin
German footballers needing infoboxes
Blau-Weiß 1890 Berlin players